2008–09 Hong Kong FA Cup (officially named Sheffield United F.A. Cup due to sponsorship from Chengdu Blades F.C. Ltd) was the 35th season of Hong Kong FA Cup.

NT Realty Wofoo Tai Po won the title, and qualified for the 2010 AFC Cup as TSW Pegasus won the 2008–09 Hong Kong Senior Challenge Shield but was not eligible to compete in Asian competitions as not a full member of the Hong Kong Football Association.

Calendar

Bracket
The draw was made on 17 April 2009.

First round

Quarter-finals

Semi-finals

Final

Scorers
The scorers in the 2008–09 Hong Kong FA Cup are as follows:

6 goals
 Chan Siu Ki (South China)

4 goals
 Itaparica (TSW Pegasus)

3 goals
 Detinho (South China)
 Ling Cong (Happy Valley)
 Edson Minga (Fourway)
 Caleb Ekwenugo (NT Realty Wofoo Tai Po)

2 goals
 Wu Jiarui (Sheffield United)
 Carlos Cáceres (Kitchee)
 Kwok Kin Pong (South China)
 Christian Annan (NT Realty Wofoo Tai Po)
 Lee Wai Lim (NT Realty Wofoo Tai Po)
 Lee Hong Lim (TSW Pegasus)
 Paulo (Fourway)

1 goal
 Hao Shuang (Sheffield United)
 Lu Di (Sheffield United)
 Paul Ngue (Kitchee)

 Luis Cupla (Kitchee)
 Yau Kam Leung (Fourway)
 Cheng Siu Wai (TSW Pegasus)
 Eugene Mbome (TSW Pegasus)
 Yuto Nakamura (TSW Pegasus)
 Diego (Happy Valley)
 Gerard Ambassa Guy (Happy Valley)
 Chao Pengfei (Happy Valley)
 Fagner (Happy Valley)
 Poon Man Tik (Happy Valley)
 So Loi Keung (NT Realty Wofoo Tai Po)
 Sze Kin Wai (NT Realty Wofoo Tai Po)
 Ye Jia (NT Realty Wofoo Tai Po)
 Victor Inegbenoise (Mutual)
 Wong Wing Sum (Sham Shui Po)
 Fong Pak Lun (Sham Shui Po)
 Hung Jing Yip (Sham Shui Po)
 Ju Yingzhi (Citizen)
 Xu Deshuai (Citizen)
 Au Yeung Yiu Chung (South China)

Own goals
 Lo Kong Wai (Sham Shui Po)

Prizes

References

External links
FA Cup - Hong Kong Football Association

Hong Kong FA Cup
Fa Cup
Hong Kong Fa Cup, 2008-09